The 1979 Michigan Wolverines football team was an American football team that represented the University of Michigan in the 1979 Big Ten Conference football season. In its 100th season of intercollegiate football, the 11th under head coach Bo Schembechler, Michigan compiled an 8–4 record (6–2 against conference opponents), lost to North Carolina in the 1979 Gator Bowl, was ranked No. 18 in the final AP Poll, and outscored opponents by a total of 312 to 151.

All four losses were by margins of two or three points with special teams errors and turnovers costly in each. In a two-point loss to Notre Dame, a pair of Michigan fumbles in the first half led to Irish field goals, and the Wolverines last-minute field goal attempt for the win was blocked. The Wolverines gave up four interceptions against Purdue and had a punt blocked and returned for the winning touchdown against Ohio State. In a two-point loss in the Gator Bowl, the Wolverines failed to convert on either point after touchdown and turned the ball over four times in the fourth quarter. And in a narrow victory over California, the Michigan kickers missed all five field goal attempts.

The team's statistical leaders included quarterback John Wangler with 1,431 passing yards, tailback Butch Woolfolk with 990 rushing yards and 78 points scored, and tight end Doug Marsh with 612 receiving yards. Linebacker Ron Simpkins was selected as both Michigan's most valuable player and a consensus first-team All-American.  Defensive end Curtis Greer also received first-team All-America honors from several selectors.

Schedule

Season summary

Preseason
The 1978 Michigan Wolverines football team compiled a 10–2 record and was ranked No. 5 in the final AP and UPI polls. Several key players from the 1978 team were lost to graduation or professional sports, including the Wolverines' 1978 starting backfield of Rick Leach, Harlan Huckleby, and Russell Davis, offensive lineman Jon Giesler (taken in the first round of the 1979 NFL Draft), and linebackers Tom Seabron and Jerry Meter. Key players returning from the 1978 team included tailback Butch Woolfolk, offensive lineman John Arbeznik, defensive tackle Curtis Greer, linebacker Ron Simpkins, and defensive back Mike Jolly.

Michigan's 1979 recruiting class included quarterback Rich Hewlett (Plymouth, Michigan), running backs Jerald Ingram (Beaver, Pennsylvania) and Lawrence Ricks (Barberton, Ohio), receivers Anthony Carter (Riviera Beach, Florida) and Craig Dunaway (Upper St. Clair, Pennsylvania), linebackers Winfred Carraway (Detroit), Paul Girgash (Lakewood, Ohio), and Jim Herrmann (Dearborn Heights, Michigan), and defensive backs Keith Bostic (Ann Arbor, Michigan) and Jerry Burgei (Ottawa, Ohio).

In May 1979, defensive tackle Curtis Greer received the Meyer Morton Award as the player showing the greatest development and promise in spring practice. Defensive lineman Mike Trgovac received the Frederick C. Matthaei Award as the junior-to-be player displaying "leadership, drive and achievement on the athletic field and in the classroom", and wing back Tony Jackson received the John F. Maulbetsch Award as the best freshman player following spring practice "on the basis of desire, character, capacity for leadership and future success on and off the gridiron."

Northwestern

    
    
    
    
    
    
    
    

On September 8, 1979, Michigan opened its season with a 49–7 victory over Northwestern before a crowd of 100,790 at Michigan Stadium in Ann Arbor, Michigan. In his first game for Michigan, Anthony Carter had a 78-yard punt return for a touchdown and later scored again on a 12-yard touchdown pass from John Wangler. Michigan totaled 347 rushing yards and 140 passing yards. Stan Edwards rushed for 99 yards on eight carries, and quarterback B. J. Dickey passed for 68 yards and a touchdown and rushed for another 85 yards and a touchdown. Wangler took over as quarterback in the third quarter and completed five of six passes for 67 yards.

Notre Dame

    
    
    
    
    
    

On September 16, 1979, Michigan, ranked No. 5 in the AP Poll, lost to No. 7 Notre Dame, 12–10, before a crowd of 105,111 at Michigan Stadium. 

In the first quarter, Michigan drove to the Notre Dame 15-yard line and took a 3–0 lead on a 30-yard field goal by Bryan Virgil. A short time later, Anthony Carter fumbled a punt return, and Notre Dame recovered the loose ball at Michigan's 36-yard line. Michigan's defense held at the 23-yard line, and Chuck Male then kicked a 40-yard field goal. At the end of the first and start of the second quarter, Michigan quarterback B. J. Dickey led a 13-play, 80-yard touchdown drive that consumed six minutes and 39 seconds. Dickey scrambled 16 yards to the one-yard line, and Stan Edwards then ran for the touchdown to put Michigan ahead, 10–3. Later in the second quarter, Dickey fumbled, and Notre Dame recovered the ball at Michigan's 39-yard line. Notre Dame advanced the ball to the 18-yard line, but a holding penalty and a sack pushed the Irish back, and Male kicked a 44-yard field goal to cut Michigan's lead to 10–6 at halftime.

Male kicked two additional field goals in the third quarter to put Notre Dame ahead, 12-10. After leading the offensive effectively in the first half, Dickey was unable to generate any offensive momentum in the third and fourth quarters.  With two minutes remaining in the game, Michigan took over at its own 42-yard line. John Wangler replaced Dickey at quarterback and led the Wolverines to the Notre Dame 25-yard line.  With six seconds remaining in the game, Michigan sent Bryan Virgil into the game to attempt a 42-yard field goal, but the kick was blocked by Bob Crable who climbed onto the back of Michigan center Mike Trgovac.

Michigan out-gained Notre Dame by 306 yards to 179 yards. Dickey rushed for 68 yards and completed nine of 18 passes for 106 yards. Virgil averaged only 29.7 yards on seven punts, including a five-yard punt in the fourth quarter. For Notre Dame, Rusty Lisch completed five of 10 passes for 65 yards, and Vagas Ferguson rushed for 118 yards on 35 carries.

Kansas

    
    
    
    
    

On September 22, 1979, Michigan defeated Kansas, 28–7, before a crowd of 103,698 at Michigan Stadium. Michigan out-gained Kansas, 467 yards to 104. Tailback Stan Edwards rushed for 106 yards on 17 carries, and John Wangler completed 12 of 18 passes for 195 yards and an interception. Ali Haji-Sheikh missed twice on 42-yard field goal attempts. Michigan's defense held Kansas to 79 passing yards, 25 rushing yards, and six first downs. Kansas' touchdown came on special teams, as Leroy Irvin returned a punt 60 yards.

California

    
    
    
    

On September 29, 1979, Michigan defeated California, 14–10, before a crowd of 57,000 at California Memorial Stadium in Berkeley, California. California took a 10-0 lead at halftime, but the Wolverines scored 14 unanswered points in the second half on touchdown runs by Stan Edwards and Lawrence Reid. Michigan out-gained California, 373 yards to 223 yards. Ali Haji-Sheikh and Bryan Virgil missed five field goal attempts.

Shippensburg beat Slippery Rock, 45–14.

Michigan State

    
    
    
    

On October 6, 1979, Michigan, ranked No. 11 by the AP, defeated No. 16 Michigan State, 21–7, before a crowd of 79,311 at Spartan Stadium in East Lansing, Michigan. 

In the first quarter, B. J. Dickey and Stan Edwards led a 14-play, 96-yard touchdown drive with Butch Woolfolk scoring on a two-yard touchdown run. In the second quarter, Michigan State's Jim Burroughs blocked a Bryan Virgil punt, and the Spartans took over at Michigan's 16-yard line. Mike Harden intercepted a pass to stop the Spartans. Later in the second quarter, Virgil's attempt at a 46-yard field goal fell short.

In the third quarter, Michigan State mounted a 55-yard touchdown drive with Derek Hughes scoring on a six-yard run. Michigan retook the lead on a 66-yard touchdown bomb from Dickey to Ralph Clayton. With two minutes remaining in the game, Michigan scored a third touchdown on a six-yard pass from Dickey to Anthony Carter.

Michigan out-gained Michigan State, 336 yards to 242 yards. For the Wolverines, Stan Edwards rushed for 139 yards on 24 carries, and Dickey completed eight of 13 passes for 137 yards and two touchdowns. For Michigan State, tailback Steve Smith rushed for 101 yards on 17 carries, and Bert Vaughn completed six of 18 for 86 yards and two interceptions.

In the week leading up to the game, Michigan coach Bo Schembechler drew criticism and comparisons to Woody Hayes for a physical encounter with a reporter for the university's student newspaper. With Michigan's kickers missing 14 of 15 field goal attempts to that point in the season, the reporter asked whether Schembechler would place greater emphasis on recruiting kickers. An angry Schembechler allegedly grabbed and threw the reporter's microphone, poked the reporter in the chest, grabbed him by the throat, and pushed him backwards.

Minnesota

    
    
    
    
    
    
    
    

On October 13, 1979, Michigan defeated Minnesota, 31-21, before a crowd of 104,677 at Michigan Stadium. 

Michigan took a 24-7 lead at halftime on a 27-yard field goal, a 54-yard touchdown run by tailback Butch Woolfolk, a one-yard touchdown run by fullback Lawrence Reid, and a one-yard touchdown pass from John Wangler to Reid. In the second half, Minnesota narrowed the lead to 24-21 on a 10-yard touchdown pass from Mark Carlson to Elmer Bailey and an 11-yard touchdown run by Glenn Lewis.  In the fourth quarter, Woolfolk extended Michigan's lead on a 41-yard touchdown run. 

Michigan totaled 537 yards of total offense, including 456 rushing yards. Woolfolk led the way with 194 yards and two touchdowns on 24 carries, and Reid added 179 yards and a touchdown on 17 carries. Minnesota  quarterback Mark Carlson threw the ball a record 51 times with 27 completions for 339 yards and three interceptions (two by Mike Jolly). Michigan held Minnesota to 29 net rushing yards and limited Marion Barber to 38 rushing yards.

Illinois

    
    
    
    
    

On October 20, 1979, Michigan defeated Gary Moeller's Illinois Fighting Illini before a crowd of 43,370 at Memorial Stadium at Champaign, Illinois. After a scoreless first half, Mike Jolly intercepted an Illinois pass at the Illini's 36-yard line, and Michigan drove for the game's first touchdown, a one-yard run by Butch Woolfolk. John Wangler also threw a 20-yard touchdown pass to Anthony Carter. Stan Edwards rushed for 81 yards on 22 carries, and Woolfolk totaled 78 yards and three touchdowns on 18 carries. Michigan's defense limited the Illini to 58 rushing yards and 26 passing yards. The game was played in 35-mile-per-hour winds. After the game, coach Bo Schembechler said: "It was definitely a wind game. . . . It was like a wind tunnel out there."

Indiana

    
    
    
    
    
    
    

On October 27, 1979, Michigan defeated Indiana, 27-21, before a crowd of 104,832 at Michigan Stadium. 

In the first quarter, linebacker Mike Lemirande recovered an Indiana fumble at the Hoosiers' 26-yard line, and Michigan capitalized on the turnover as B. J. Dickey ran 19 yards to the three-yard line, and Lawrence Reid then ran for the touchdown.  In the second quarter, Indiana executed a 98-yard touchdown drive and later took a 14-7 lead with one minute left in the half.

Michigan opened the second half with a 50-yard touchdown run by Lawrence Reid and then retook the lead on its next drive, Butch Woolfolk scoring on a two-yard run.

Late in the fourth quarter, Indiana quarterback Tim Clifford led the Hoosiers on a 79-yard touchdown drive, including a 54-yard pass to the Michigan two-yard line.  Indiana tied the game with 55 seconds remaining on a short pass from Clifford to Dave Harangody.

With 51 seconds remaining, Michigan began at its own 22-yard line. Lawrence Reid caught a pass and intentionally tossed the ball out of bounds (into the hands of Indiana coach Lee Corso) at the Indiana 45-yard line with six seconds remaining. Wangler then passed to Anthony Carter at the 23-yard line, and Carter evaded two tacklers at the 20-yard line and another inside the five-yard line, crossing the goal line for the winning touchdown. The play was made famous by Bob Ufer's emotional radio narration as the play unfolded:"Under center is Wangler at the 45, he goes back. He's looking for a receiver. He throws downfield to Carter.  Carter has it.  [unintellibible screaming]  Carter scores. . . . I have never seen anything like this in all my 40 years of covering Michigan football. . . .  I hope you can hear me – because I've never been so happy in all my cotton-picking 59 years! . . . Johnny Wangler to Anthony Carter will be heard until another 100 years of Michigan football is played! . . .  Meeeshigan wins, 27 to 21. They aren't even going to try the extra point. Who cares? Who gives a damn?"
The game-winning pass from Wangler to Carter has been called "the greatest single play in the 100-year history of Michigan football." 

The Wolverines out-gained the Hoosiers by 489 yards to 393 yards. Wangler completed 10 of 14 passes for 163 yards while Butch Woolfolk and Lawrence Reid rushed for 127 and 99 yards respectively. For Indiana, Tim Clifford completed 12 of 26 passes for 232 yards, and Mike Harkrader rushed for 80 yards on 23 carries.

Wisconsin

On November 3, 1979, Michigan defeated Wisconsin, 54–0, before a crowd of 104,952 at Michigan Stadium. John Wangler started at quarterback in place of B. J. Dickey who was recovering from a shoulder injury. Wangler completed 10 of 13 passes for 219 yards, including a 71-yard touchdown pass to Doug Marsh. Butch Woolfolk rushed for 190 yards and three touchdowns on 19 carries. In the third quarter, Woolfolk had a 92-yard touchdown run that broke the former Michigan record of 86 yards set by Tom Harmon.

Purdue

    
    
    
    
    
    
    
    

On November 10, 1979, Michigan lost to Purdue, 21–24, before a crowd of 69,829 at Ross–Ade Stadium in West Lafayette, Indiana. Michigan trailed by 24-6 with 10 minutes remaining and scored 15 points in a comeback effort that fell short. Michigan threw four interceptions. After the game, coach Bo Schembechler praised his team's effort in the comeback attempt: "Our players showed a lot of character, as bad as we looked. It is as good a group of kids as I've ever had. They won't lay down and die."

Ohio State

On November 17, 1979, Michigan, ranked No. 13 by the AP, lost to No. 2 Ohio State, 18–15, at Michigan Stadium. The game attracted a crowd of 106,255, an NCAA record for a regular season game. It was the first Michigan–Ohio State game for the Buckeyes' new head coach Earle Bruce.

On Ohio State's second possession, Mike Harden intercepted an Art Schlichter pass and returned it to the Ohio State 32-yard line. Michigan drove to the one-yard line, but Michigan quarterback Rich Hewlett was dropped for a loss on fourth-and one. At the end of the first quarter, Ray Ellis intercepted a Rich Hewlett pass and returned it to the Michigan 38-yard line. Michigan's defense held, and Ohio State was forced to punt. On Michigan's next possession, the Wolverines called a fake punt on fourth down from their own 37-yard line, but punter Bryan Virgil threw an incomplete pass. Ohio State took over with good field position but was again forced to punt.

Later in the second quarter, Ohio State's run game gained momentum and the Buckeyes drove to the six-yard line. At that point, the Michigan defense held, and Vlade Janakievski kicked a 23-yard field goal with 3:48 to go in the half. On Michigan's next possession following the Janakievski field goal, John Wangler replaced Hewlett at quarterback. Wangler hit Anthony Carter on a 59-yard touchdown pass to put Michigan ahead, 7-3, with 1:30 left in the half. After Michigan's touchdown, Schlichter passed the Buckeyes quickly down the field, and Janakievski kicked a 25-yard field goal with eight seconds left in the half. Michigan led, 7-6, at halftime.

On their first possession of the third quarter, Ohio State drove from its own 49-yard line to the one-yard line, but penalties pushed the Buckeyes back to the 18-yard line. Schlichter then threw an 18-yard touchdown pass to Hunter, but his throw for a two-point conversion fell incomplete. Ohio State led, 12-7. On Michigan's next possession, Wangler connected with Carter for a 66-yard pass at the Ohio State 19-yard line. Roosevelt Smith then scored on a one-yard run, and Smith ran again for a successful two-point conversion. Michigan led, 15-12.

Late in the third quarter, Ohio State drove deep into Michigan territory, James Gayle fumbled at its own nine-yard line, with Mike Jolly recovering for Michigan. In the fourth quarter, Ohio State blocked a Bryan Virgil punt, and Todd Bell returned it 18 yards for the game-winning touchdown. Janakievski's kick failed, and Ohio State led, 18-15. 

The ABC broadcast crew named Schlichter and Michigan middle guard Mike Trgovac as the Chevrolet Most Valuable Players of the game. Schlichter completed 12 of 22 passes for 196 yards, a touchdown, and an interception. Trgovac had 11 solo tackles and five assists.

For Ohio State, James Gayle rushed for 72 yards on nine carries, and Doug Donley caught three passes for 87 yards. For Michigan, Wangler completed four of nine passes for 133 yards, a touchdown, and an interception with three seconds remaining in the game. Butch Woolfolk rushed for 68 yards on 18 carries, and Anthony Carter caught two passes for 125 yards and a touchdown.

Gator Bowl

    
    
    
    
    
    

On December 28, 1979, Michigan lost to North Carolina, 17–15, before a crowd of 70,407 in the 1979 Gator Bowl in Jacksonville, Florida.

Neither team scored in the first quarter. On North Carolina's first two drives, quarterback Matt Kupec led the Tar Heels deep into Michigan territory. On both occasions, North Carolina missed on field goal attempts into the wind. On Michigan's first play from scrimmage, John Wangler threw a bomb to Anthony Carter that was good for a 47-yard gain. A sack pushed Michigan back, and the Wolverines were forced to punt.

Late in the first quarter, Amos Lawrence fumbled, and Mike Harden recovered the loose ball at Michigan's 38-yard line. Wangler led the Wolverines downfield, the big gain coming on a 50-yard pass to Ralph Clayton at the North Carolina six-yard line. North Carolina's defense held, and Michigan settled for a 20-yard field goal by Bryan Virgil. On Michigan's next possession, Wangler threw a pass to Carter who ran untouched into the end zone for a 53-yard touchdown. Virgil's extra point kick failed, and Michigan led, 9–0.  

On Michigan's next possession after the Carter touchdown, Wangler was sacked by Lawrence Taylor at the Michigan three-yard line. Wangler sustained torn ligaments in his right knee and did not return to the game. Michigan was forced to punt from deep in its own territory, and North Carolina took over at Michigan's 42-yard line. Kupec again led the Tar Heels downfield, and Doug Paschal scored on a one-yard run to narrow Michigan's lead to 9–7 at halftime.

In the third quarter, North Carolina mounted a 97-yard, six-minute drive and took a 14–9 lead on a 12-yard touchdown pass from Kupec to Phil Farris. North Carolina extended its lead to 17–9 on a 32-yard field goal in the fourth quarter.

In the fourth quarter, Michigan moved downfield on a 42-yard pass interference penalty on a reverse play with Anthony Carter attempting a long pass downfield to Ralph Clayton. On the next play from scrimmage, B. J. Dickey fumbled on a pitch-out, and North Carolina recovered the loose ball at the Tar Heel 35-yard line. Dickey's fumble was the fourth Michigan turnover (two interceptions and two fumbles) of the fourth quarter. Finally, with 1:28 left in the game, Dickey threw a 30-yard touchdown pass to Carter. Michigan attempted a two-point conversion for the tie, but Dickey's pass to Carter was broken up, and an onside kick attempt failed.

In the first quarter-and-a-half of play, Wangler had completed six of eight passes for 203 yards. With Dickey at quarterback for the last two-and-a-half quarters, Michigan had difficulty moving the ball until its final drive. After the game, Schembechler said, "Wangler hit some big plays. Losing him was one of those things. A good football team has to overcome that." North Carolina quarterback Matt Kupec and running back Amos Lawrence tied for the outstanding player of the game award. Kupec completed 19 of 28 passes for 161 yards, and Lawrence rushed for 110 yards on 23 carries and caught five passes for 30 yards.

Award season
Two Michigan players received first-team honors on the 1979 All-America college football team:
 Linebacker Ron Simpkins was a consensus All-American, receiving first-team honors from the Associated Press (AP), Football Writers Association of America (FWAA), United Press International (UPI), and Walter Camp Football Foundation.  
 Defensive end Curtis Greer received first-team honors from the American Football Coaches Association, FWAA, and Newspaper Enterprise Association.

Seven Michigan players received first-team honors from the AP or UP on the 1979 All-Big Ten Conference football team: linebacker Ron Simpkins (AP-1, UPI-1); defensive end Curtis Greer (AP-1, UPI-1); running back Butch Woolfolk (AP-1, UPI-1); defensive back Mike Jolly (AP-1, UPI-1); offensive guard John Arbeznik (UPI-1); and defensive lineman Mike Trgovac (UPI-1).

Linebacker Ron Simpkins receive the team's most valuable player award, and Dan Murry received the Arthur Robinson Scholarship Award.

Personnel

Full roster

Letter winners, offense
John Arbeznik, offensive guard, senior, University Heights, Ohio - started all 12 games at left offensive guard
Kurt Becker, offensive guard, junior, Aurora, Illinois - started all 12 games at right offensive guard
Norm Betts, tight end, sophomore, Midland, Michigan
Keith Bostic, running back, freshman, Ann Arbor, Michigan
Mike Cade, running back, freshman, Elroy, Arizona
Anthony Carter, wide receiver, freshman, Riviera Beach, Florida - started 2 games at wide receiver
Chuck Christian, tight end, junior, Detroit, Michigan
Ralph Clayton, wing back, senior, Detroit, Michigan - started all 12 games at wing back 
B. J. Dickey, quarterback, junior, Ottawa, Ohio - started 7 games at quarterback
Craig Dunaway, tight end, freshman, Pittsburgh, Pennsylvania
Stanley Edwards, tailback, junior, Detroit, Michigan - started 7 games at tailback
Rodney Feaster, wide receiver, junior, Flint, Michigan
Jeff Felten, center, sophomore, Centreville, Michigan
Tim Garrity, center, sophomore, Grafton, Wisconsin
Ali Haji-Sheikh, place-kicker, freshman, Arlington, Texas
Rich Hewlett, quarterback, freshman, Plymouth, Michigan - started 1 game at quarterback
Jerald Ingram, fullback, freshman, Beaver, Pennsylvania
Tony Jackson, wing back, sophomore, Cleveland, Ohio
Mike Leoni, offensive tackle, senior, Flint, Michigan - started 4 games at left offensive tackle
Tony Leoni, tailback, senior, Flint, Michigan
George Lilja, center, senior, Palos Park, Illinois - started all 12 games at center
Doug Marsh, tight end, senior, Akron, Ohio 
Alan Mitchell, wide receiver, junior, Detroit, Michigan - started 10 games at wide receiver
Ed Muransky, offensive tackle, sophomore, Youngstown, Ohio - started all 12 games at right offensive tackle
Jim Paciorek, tight end, sophomore, Orchard Lake, Michigan
Bubba Paris, offensive tackle, sophomore, Louisville, Kentucky - started 8 games at left offensive tackle
Gary Quinn, offensive guard, senior, Quincy, Massachusetts
Lawrence P. Reid, fullback, senior, Philadelphia, Pennsylvania - started 10 games at fullback
Lawrence Ricks, tailback, freshman, Barberton, Ohio
Roosevelt Smith, tailback, senior, Detroit, Michigan - started 2 games at fullback
Rich Strenger, offensive tackle, sophomore, Grafton, Wisconsin
Bryan Virgil, place-kicker, senior, Buchanan, Michigan
John Wangler, quarterback, senior, Royal Oak, Michigan - started 4 games at quarterback
Butch Woolfolk, tailback, sophomore, Westfield, New Jersey - started 5 games at tailback

Letter winners, defense
Marion Body, defensive back, sophomore, Detroit, Michigan
Mark Braman, defensive back, senior, Midland, Michigan - started all 12 games at strong-side cornerback 
Andy Cannavino, inside linebacker, junior, Cleveland, Ohio - started all 12 games at inside linebacker 
Brian Carpenter, defensive back, sophomore, Flint, Michigan
Winfred Carraway, linebacker, freshman, Detroit, Michigan
Cedric Coles, defensive tackle, sophomore, Detroit, Michigan
Gerald Diggs, defensive back, senior, Chicago, Illinois
Paul Girgash, linebacker, freshman, Lakewood, Ohio
Chris Godfrey, defensive tackle, senior, Lathrup Village, Michigan 
Curtis Greer, defensive tackle, senior, Detroit, Michigan - started all 12 games at defensive tackle 
Mike Harden, defensive back, senior, Detroit, Michigan - started all 12 games at safety 
Stuart Harris, defensive back, junior, Chagrin Falls, Ohio - started 9 games at wolfman
Irvin Johnson, inside linebacker, senior, Warren, Ohio
Mike Jolly, defensive back, senior, Melvindale, Michigan - started all 12 games at weak-side cornerback 
Dale Keitz, defensive tackle, senior, Columbus, Ohio - started 1 game at middle guard
Tom Keller, outside linebacker, senior, Grand Rapids, Michigan
Mike Lemirande, outside linebacker, sophomore, Grafton, Wisconsin
Thomas E. Moss, middle guard, senior, Detroit, Michigan
Ben Needham, outside linebacker, junior, Groveport, Ohio - started 11 games at outside linebacker  
Dave Nicolau, defensive tackle, junior, Elk Grove Village, Illinois
Mel Owens, outside linebacker, senior, DeKalb, Illinois - started all 12 games at outside linebacker 
David Payne, inside linebacker, senior, Detroit, Michigan
Jeff Reeves, defensive back, sophomore, Columbus, Ohio - started 3 games at wolfman
Ron Simpkins, inside linebacker, senior, Detroit, Michigan - started all 12 games at inside linebacker 
Robert Thompson, outside linebacker, sophomore, Blue Island, Illinois - started 1 game at outside linebacker
Mike Trgovac, middle guard, junior, Austintown, Ohio - started 11 games at middle guard
Gary Weber, defensive tackle, senior, Matawan, New Jersey

Professional football
Twenty-five (25) members of the 1979 Michigan football team went on to play professional football.  They are: 
Kurt Becker (Chicago Bears, 1982–88, 1990, Los Angeles Rams, 1989)
Marion Body  (Michigan Panthers, 1983)
Keith Bostic (Houston Oilers, 1983–88, Cleveland Browns, 1990)
Andy Cannavino (Michigan Panthers, 1983, Chicago Blitz, 1984)
Brian Carpenter (New York Giants, 1982, Washington Redskins, 1983-84, Buffalo Bills, 1984)
Anthony Carter (Michigan Panthers, 1983–84, Oakland Invaders, 1985, Minnesota Vikings, 1985–93, Detroit Lions, 1994-95)
Ralph Clayton (St. Louis Cardinals, 1981)
Craig Dunaway (Pittsburgh Steelers, 1983)
Stanley Edwards (Houston Oilers, 1982–86, Detroit Lions, 1987)
Paul Girgash (Michigan Panthers, 1984)
Chris Godfrey (New York Jets, 1980, New York Giants, 1984-87, Seattle Seahawks, 1988)
Curtis Greer (St. Louis Cardinals, 1980–87)
Ali Haji-Sheikh (New York Giants, 1983–85, Atlanta Falcons, 1986, Washington Redskins, 1987)
Mike Harden (Denver Broncos, 1980–88, Los Angeles Raiders, 1989–90)
Mike Jolly (Green Bay Packers, 1980–83)
George Lilja (Los Angeles Rams, 1982, New York Jets, 1983–84, Cleveland Browns, 1984–86, Dallas Cowboys, 1987)
Doug Marsh (St. Louis Cardinals, 1980–86)
Ed Muransky (Los Angeles Raiders, 1982–84, Orlando Renegades, 1985)
Mel Owens (Los Angeles Rams, 1981–89)
Bubba Paris (San Francisco 49ers, 1983–90, Indianapolis Colts, 1991, Detroit Lions 1991)
Lawrence Ricks (Kansas City Chiefs, 1983–84)
Ron Simpkins (Cincinnati Bengals, 1980–86, Green Bay Packers, 1988)
Rich Strenger (Detroit Lions, 1983–87)
Robert Thompson (Tampa Bay Buccaneers, 1983–84, Detroit Lions, 1987)
Butch Woolfolk (New York Giants, 1982–84, Houston Oilers, 1985-86, Detroit Lions, 1987–88)

Coaching staff
Head coach: Bo Schembechler
Assistant coaches: 
 Bill McCartney - defensive coordinator and inside linebackers coach (joined Schembechler's staff in 1974, became defensive coordinator in 1977)
 Jack Harbaugh - defensive backs coach (joined Schembechler's staff in 1973)
 Dennis Brown - outside linebackers coach (joined Schembechler's staff in 1972)
 Milan Vooletich - defensive line coach (joined Schembechler's staff in 1978)
 Don Nehlen - offensive backfield coach (joined Schembechler's staff in 1977)
 Tirrel Burton - offensive ends coach (joined Schembechler's staff in 1970)
 Jerry Hanlon - offensive line coach (held same position since 1969)
 Paul Schudel - offensive interior line coach (joined Schembechler's staff in 1975)
 Bob Thornbladh - special assistant (joined Schembechler's staff in 1975)
 Mike Gittleson - strength coach (joined Schembechler's staff in 1979)
Trainer: Russ Miller
Manager: Thomas J. Anderson

Statistics

Rushing

Passing

Receiving

References

External links
  1979 Football Team -- Bentley Historical Library, University of Michigan Athletics History

Michigan
Michigan Wolverines football seasons
Michigan Wolverines football